The following is a list of Aston Martin automobiles ordered by year of introduction.

Pre-war cars 

 1921–1925 Aston Martin Standard Sports
 1927–1932 Aston Martin First Series
 1929–1932 Aston Martin International
 1932–1932 Aston Martin International Le Mans
 1932–1934 Aston Martin Le Mans
 1933–1934 Aston Martin 12/50 Standard
 1934–1936 Aston Martin Mk II
 1934–1936 Aston Martin Ulster
 1936–1940 Aston Martin 2-litre Speed Models (23 built) The last 8 were fitted with C-type bodywork
 1937–1939 Aston Martin 15/98

Post-war sports and GT cars 

 1948–1950 Aston Martin 2-Litre Sports (DB1)
 1950–1953 Aston Martin DB2
 1953–1957 Aston Martin DB2/4
 1957–1959 Aston Martin DB Mark III
 1958–1963 Aston Martin DB4
 1961–1963 Aston Martin DB4 GT Zagato
 1963–1965 Aston Martin DB5
 1965–1966 Aston Martin Short Chassis Volante
 1965–1969 Aston Martin DB6
 1967–1972 Aston Martin DBS
 1969–1989 Aston Martin V8
 1977–1989 Aston Martin V8 Vantage
 1986–1990 Aston Martin V8 Zagato
 1989–1996 Aston Martin Virage/Virage Volante
 1989–2000 Aston Martin Virage
 1993–2000 Aston Martin Vantage
 1996–2000 Aston Martin V8 Coupe/V8 Volante
 1993–2003 Aston Martin DB7/DB7 Vantage
 2001–2007 Aston Martin V12 Vanquish/Vanquish S
 2002–2003 Aston Martin DB7 Zagato
 2002–2004 Aston Martin DB AR1
 2004–2016 Aston Martin DB9
 2005–2018 Aston Martin V8 and V12 Vantage
 2007–2012 Aston Martin DBS V12
 2009–2012 Aston Martin One-77
 2010–2020 Aston Martin Rapide/Rapide S
 2011–2012 Aston Martin Virage/Virage Volante
 2011–2013 Aston Martin Cygnet, based on the Toyota iQ
 2012–2013 Aston Martin V12 Zagato
 2012–2018 Aston Martin Vanquish/Vanquish Volante
 2015–2016 Aston Martin Vulcan
 2016–present Aston Martin DB11
 2018–present Aston Martin Vantage
 2018–present Aston Martin DBS Superleggera
 2020–present Aston Martin DBX

Concept and Special editions

 1944 Aston Martin Atom (concept)
 1961–1964 Lagonda Rapide
 1976–1989 Aston Martin Lagonda
 1980 Aston Martin Bulldog (concept)
 1993 Lagonda Vignale (concept)
 2007 Aston Martin V12 Vantage RS (concept)
 2007–2008 Aston Martin V8 Vantage N400
 2009 Aston Martin Lagonda SUV (concept)
 2010 Aston Martin V12 Vantage Carbon Black Edition
 2010 Aston Martin DBS Carbon Black Edition
 2013 Aston Martin Rapide Bertone Jet 2+2 (concept)
 2013 Aston Martin CC100 Speedster (concept)
 2015 Aston Martin DB10 (concept)
 2015–2016 Lagonda Taraf
 2020– Aston Martin V12 Speedster
 2020– Aston Martin Vantage 007 Edition
 2020–  Aston Martin DBS Superleggera 007 Edition
 2020 Aston Martin Victor
 2022– Aston Martin V12 Vantage (Coupe & Roadster)
 2023– Aston Martin DBS 770 Ultimate (Coupe & Cabriolet)

Current models

 Aston Martin DB11
 Aston Martin DBS Superleggera
 Aston Martin DBX
 Aston Martin Vantage

Upcoming models

 Aston Martin Valkyrie
 Aston Martin Valhalla

Gallery

References

Aston Martin
Aston Martin vehicles
Car models
Aston Martin